Air Chief Marshal Sir David George Evans,  (14 July 1924 – 21 February 2020) was a senior commander of the Royal Air Force.

Career
Born and educated in Canada, Evans was commissioned into the Royal Air Force as a pilot officer under an emergency commission on 7 April 1944 during the Second World War. He underwent pilot training in Canada and he then completed operational training in Ismaïlia in Egypt. On 7 October 1944, he was promoted to flying officer (war substantive). Evans was one of the first RAF officers to enter Bergen-Belsen concentration camp.

He was promoted to flight lieutenant (war substantive) on 7 April 1946. His promotion to flying officer was confirmed on 30 September 1947 with seniority from 7 April 1946. Evans was promoted to the substantive rank of flight lieutenant on 29 October 1948, with promotions to squadron leader on 1 October 1954, to wing commander on 1 July 1959 and to group captain on 1 July 1964.

He piloted the British bobsleigh team at the 1964 Olympics.

In 1973 Evans was made Air Officer Commanding No. 1 Group, in 1976 he was appointed Vice Chief of the Air Staff and he went on to be Air Officer Commanding-in-Chief RAF Strike Command the following year. He was Vice-Chief of the Defence Staff from 1981 to 1983.

Later life
In retirement, Evans became a Non-Executive Director of British Aerospace.

Awards and decorations
On 9 June 1955, Squadron Leader Evans was awarded the Queen's Commendation for Valuable Service in the Air.

In 1985 he was made King of Arms of the Order of the Bath.

References

|-

|-

|-

|-

1924 births
2020 deaths
Commanders of the Order of the British Empire
Knights Grand Cross of the Order of the Bath
Recipients of the Commendation for Valuable Service in the Air
Royal Air Force air marshals
Royal Air Force personnel of World War II
Canadian military personnel from Ontario